Variation Biotechnologies Inc. (VBI), also known as VBI Vaccines Inc., is a biopharmaceutical company, headquartered in Cambridge, Massachusetts, with research facilities in Ottawa, Ontario, Canada, and a research and manufacturing site in Rehovot, Israel. Its Ottawa facility has approximately thirty researchers working with National Research Council of Canada (NRC) to produce a COVID-19 vaccine—VBI-2902. In August VBI received CA$56 million from the Government of Canada to prepare its vaccine for clinical trials by the end of 2020. The company's CEO, Jeff Baxter, said that VBI-2902 is cheaper to produce than other vaccines.


Background

By 2007, VBI had received financial support from the National Research Council of Canada's Industrial Research Assistance Program, Innovation, Science and Economic Development Canada and Investissement Quebec. The company was originally financed by Clarus Ventures, a global life sciences venture capital firm under then CEO is Jeffrey Leiden, ARCH Venture Partners, 5AM Ventures and other private investors.

VBI-2902 vaccine

In early 2020, in collaboration with NRC the VBI's vaccine—VBI-2900—was developed. According to the company, they have two vaccine candidates—"enveloped virus-like particle (eVLP)". VBI-2901 is a "trivalent pan-coronavirus vaccine expressing the SARS-CoV-2, SARS-CoV, and MERS-CoV spike proteins". VBI-2902 is a "monovalent COVID-19-specific vaccine expressing the SARS-CoV-2 spike protein". By March 9, the initial Phase 1/2 study of VBI-2902 was underway. VBI received CA$56 million from the federal government towards the COVID-19 vaccine development. The company's CEO, Jeff Baxter, said that VBI-2902 is cheaper to produce than other vaccines.

References

External links
 

Medical and health organizations based in the United States
Biotechnology companies of the United States
COVID-19 vaccine producers